Elyse Marie Pahler (April 24, 1980 – July 22, 1995) was an American murder victim whose parents attempted to sue the thrash metal band Slayer, claiming that the band's music contributed to their daughter's death. Pahler was murdered in the summer of 1995.

Murder
15-year-old Elyse Pahler's body was discovered near her home in Arroyo Grande, California, in March 1996. She had been raped and murdered there eight months earlier by acquaintances Jacob Delashmutt, Joseph Fiorella, and Royce Casey. The perpetrators apparently returned to her corpse and had sex with it on several occasions. The body was located after Casey confessed to the crime following a conversion to Christianity. All three eventually pleaded no contest to her murder and are now imprisoned and serving life imprisonment.

The trio lured Elyse from her house with the stated intention of killing her as part of a Satanic ritual, although the crime bears many of the hallmarks of similar sexually motivated murders. In their defense, the defendants said they had needed to commit a "sacrifice to the devil" to give their heavy metal band, Hatred, the "craziness" to "go professional".

Lawsuit
David and Lisanne Pahler claimed that the Slayer songs "Postmortem" and "Dead Skin Mask" (from the albums Reign in Blood and Seasons in the Abyss, respectively) gave the three killers detailed instructions to "stalk, rape, torture, murder and commit acts of necrophilia" on their daughter. The lawsuit was originally filed in 1996 but delayed until 2000 when the killers' trial was concluded. The initial case was originally thrown out, the judge stating, "There's not a legal position that could be taken that would make Slayer responsible for the girl's death. Where do you draw the line? You might as well start looking through the library at every book on the shelf."

Undeterred, the Pahlers launched a second lawsuit claiming that Slayer "knowingly distributed harmful material to minors". This case too was dismissed, with Judge E. Jeffrey Burke stating, "I do not consider Slayer's music obscene, indecent or harmful to minors."

Jacob Delashmutt himself stated in a Washington Post interview, "The music is destructive [but] that's not why Elyse was murdered. She was murdered because Joe [Fiorella] was obsessed with her, and obsessed with killing her."

Aftermath
Royce Casey was denied parole by governor Gavin Newsom in July 2021, Joseph Fiorella has a parole hearing tentatively scheduled for July 2023 after voluntarily waiving his right to a hearing for one year and Jacob Delashmutt has a parole hearing which is scheduled for December 2024.

Royce Casey is imprisoned in the Valley State Prison. Joseph Fiorella is imprisoned in the High Desert State Prison, and Jacob Delashmutt is incarcerated in the Correctional Training Facility.

References

External links
 , the memorial website for Elyse Marie Pahler

1980 births
1995 deaths
1995 murders in the United States
Deaths by person in California
Murdered American children
Obscenity controversies in music
People murdered in California
Murder committed by minors
Crimes involving Satanism or the occult
Arroyo Grande, California
Necrophilia
History of women in California
Incidents of violence against girls